is a passenger railway station  located in Kita-ku Kobe, Hyōgo Prefecture, Japan. It is operated by the private transportation company, Kobe Electric Railway (Shintetsu).

Lines

Station layout
The station consists of two ground-level unnumbered side platforms, connected to the station building by a level crossing.

Platforms

History
The station was opened on July 1, 1966

Passenger statistics
In fiscal 2019, the station was used by an average of 2,436 passengers daily

Surrounding area
The surrounding area is a residential area developed by Kobe City.
Hyogo Prefectural Route 15 Kobe Sanda Line (Arima Highway)
Hyogo Prefectural Kobe Kita High School

See also
List of railway stations in Japan

References

External links 

 Official home page 

Railway stations in Kobe
Railway stations in Japan opened in 1966